Paritosh Chakrabarti is a Bangladesh Nationalist Party politician and the former Member of Parliament of Rangpur-2.

Career
Chakrabarti was elected to parliament from Rangpur-2 as a Jatiya Party candidate in 1996 by-election. The by-elections were called after Hussain Mohammad Ershad, who was elected from 5 constituencies, resigned and choose to represent Rangpur-3. He left Jatiya Party and joined Bangladesh Nationalist Party. He served as the Vice-President of Rangpur District unit of Bangladesh Nationalist Party. He resigned from Bangladesh Nationalist Party on 12 August 2016.

References

Bangladesh Nationalist Party politicians
Living people
5th Jatiya Sangsad members
Year of birth missing (living people)